San Miguel Department is a  department of Corrientes Province in Argentina.

Settlements
Loreto
San Miguel
 San Roque

Departments of Corrientes Province